The Virginia and Truckee Railroad is a privately owned heritage railroad, headquartered in Virginia City, Nevada. When first constructed in the 19th century, it was a commercial freight railroad  which was originally built to serve the Comstock Lode mining communities of northwestern Nevada. 

At its height, the railroad's route ran from Reno south to the state capital at Carson City. In Carson City, the mainline split into two branches. One branch continued south to Minden, while the other branch traveled east to Virginia City. The first section from Virginia City to Carson City was constructed beginning in 1869 to haul ore, lumber and supplies for the Comstock Lode silver mines. The railroad was abandoned in 1950 after years of declining revenue. Much of the track was pulled up and sold, along with the remaining locomotives and cars. In the 1970s, with public interest in historic railroads on the rise, efforts began to rebuild the line.  The portion from Virginia City and Gold Hill has been rebuilt by private interests, and is operated separately from a portion from Gold Hill to Mound House, that was rebuilt with public funding and private donations.

History

Comstock Lode

Gold was discovered in Nevada (then western Utah Territory) in spring 1850, by a company of Mormon emigrants on their way to the California Gold Rush. These early travelers only lingered in Nevada until they could cross the Sierras. By 1858 prospectors were soon permanently camping in the area around what is now Virginia City. In 1859, gold was found in outcroppings in the hills and canyons just outside what is now Virginia City. Among the gold ore in these outcroppings were bluish chunks of silver ore which clogged the rockers. Silver was not recognized in this form, so initially, it was overlooked in favor of the gold, and later found to be quite valuable. This was the first of the silver from what came to be called the Comstock Lode.

Numerous mills appeared along the Carson River from Dayton to Brunswick (toward Eagle Valley (Carson City)) to process the ore from the Comstock Lode. Low interest rates enticed mine and mill owners alike to finance through the bank. Many of these mills and some mines were built with loans from the Bank of California, whose Nevada agent, William Sharon, would foreclose upon the mines or mills when their owners defaulted on payments. The bank gradually came into possession of many important mining and ore-processing facilities. Sharon, along with business partners Darius Ogden Mills and William Ralston, formed the bank-owned Union Mill & Mining Company to process the ore from the mills that had been foreclosed upon.

Initially, the Comstock Lode was a boon for the Virginia City area, as the city grew to over 25,000 inhabitants at its height, and was among the largest and wealthiest towns in the West. However, from the beginning, the costs to transport Comstock ore to the mills from points on the Lode (as well, to return with wood and lumber to supply the mines) became so great that many mines were closed and only the higher quality ores were worth processing in the mines that stayed open. Being in control of mines and mills with his partners, Sharon realized that a cheap form of transportation between the mines, the mills, and the cities would allow the banks holdings to be more profitable.

Early years
There were many propositions starting as early as 1861 for railroads to service the area and decrease costs. Sharon eventually (with the addition of $500,000 in county bonds to move the railroad), envisioned a railroad to run from Virginia City, through Gold Hill where the first of the Comstock Lode was mined, passing the mills along the river, ending at the state capital, Carson City. When finished, this route would cover 21 miles, descend 1,575 feet of elevation and have so many curves as to make 17 full circles in the thirteen and a half miles from the river to Virginia City. Ground was broken on February 18, 1869, two miles below Gold Hill on American Flats when grading crews went to work. There were seven tunnels on the line requiring 2 – 5 months each to hole through and an 85 ft tall, 500 ft long trestle to be built over the Crown Point ravine. The first track and ceremonial first spike was driven on September 28, 1869 by superintendent H. M. Yerington, with the first passenger train pulling into Virginia City on Jan. 29, 1870. The railroad served as a reliable connection for residents of Carson City and Virginia City. By December, 1869 special rail cars were outfitted to bring theater patrons from Carson City to Virginia City for Piper's Opera House presentations.

Named the Lyon, engine No. 1 was one of three 2-6-0's purchased from H.J. Booth by the fledgling railroad, along with engine No. 2, the Ormsby and No. 3, the Storey. The railroad placed orders for five locomotives, three from H.J. Booth and two from Baldwin Locomotive Works in Philadelphia, Pennsylvania. The first three of the five original locomotives purchased were named after Nevada counties. The last two of the five were built by Baldwin, engine No. 4, the Virginia and engine No. 5, the Carson, named after the respective towns. The Booth and Baldwin locomotives were disassembled at Reno on a Central Pacific siding. The "Lyon", "Ormsby" and "Storey" were hauled to Carson via Washoe Valley and reassembled in the shops. The "Virginia" and "Carson" were hauled up the Geiger Grade from Reno to Virginia City, thus reassembled. They had the distinction of being the first locomotives in Virginia City. The Lyon, with the distinction of being the first locomotive for the V&T RR, was also the engine that pulled the work train, arriving in Virginia City on January 28, 1870, and completing the initially planned route. The line was opened in its entirety on Jan 29 with regular passenger service starting on Feb 1, 1870

On Nov. 12, 1869 V&T Engine no. 2, an H.J. Booth 2-6-0, pulled the first car of revenue for the company from Carson City to Gold Hill, a flat car loaded with lumber for the Crown Point Company. This milestone was also marked by the opening of the Crown Point Ravine trestle and the first crossing of the work train, engine No. 1 plus four cars, followed closely behind by engine No. 2, plus four cars (1 revenue). It is assumed that from the 12th to the 18th the railroad laid track (spurs) to service the local mines of Gold Hill, for without the track, the railroad could not get cars in to load, although no sources have been found to reference this. On Nov. 18 1869, engine No. 1 hauled the railroads first revenue train of ore from the Yellow Jacket mine. By December 21, regular scheduled trains were running between Gold Hill and Carson City, hauling wood and lumber up the hill and ore back down to the mills.

In the chapter above from the Gold Hill Daily News, it states that low grade ore was valued at $26 – $28.00 to the ton. It also states that (after transportation and milling costs, 'yield under the stamps') the result would be around $17.00 to the ton coming back to the mine. Milling rates were about $7/ton. Based on an average of $27/ton of low grade ore, that left a freight cost of $3/ton. That one ton of ore could pay the wages for 3 experienced underground miners and a carpenter for a day, so the mines could cover their costs selling the low-grade ore to pay expenses, and reap the profits from the high grade. With the coming of the railroad, a reduction in freight rates for lumber by almost half occurred, and the railroad could haul more material by the trainload, so mining activity increased, creating more business for the railroad. Sharon's idea of low cost transportation paid off.

The railroad cost $1,750,000 to build, not including the cost of rolling stock or buildings. The V&T ran 30 - 45 trains per day at the height of the Big Bonanza from Carson to Virginia City and Gold Hill. Still primarily a freight railroad, there were 22 locomotives and 361 freight cars in use at the peak of the Virginia and Truckee operations (1876 & 1877), which carried over 400,000 tons of freight per month. This was in contrast to a mere 10 passenger cars.

Expansion and prosperity
In late 1871, a line extension to Reno was begun, to connect the V&T line with the Central Pacific Railroad. This would allow through train service between Virginia City and San Francisco. Construction began with track being installed starting at the Reno end of the line. The first train to run end-to-end from Virginia City to Reno took place on August 24, 1872, pulled appropriately by the road's newest locomotive at the time, No. 11, the Reno. This milestone marked the completion of the Virginia and Truckee Railroad. In 1875, the railroad was earning a profit of over $100,000 per month and started paying annual dividends of $360,000 (or $30,000/month) to investors.

In 1880, the V&T built a three-foot narrow gauge railroad called the Carson & Colorado. The railroad ran from Mound House, just east of Carson City, to the southern part of California, and supposedly to the Colorado River where new mining claims were being struck. This never did pan out, and by 1891 those claim sites were all but forgotten. A liability to the V&T, the "slim princess" was sold to the Southern Pacific Railroad in 1900. In the words of Ogden Mills, "Either we built this line 300 miles too short or 300 years too early" reflected V&T's attitude towards the railroad.

Shortly after the sale of the C&C, silver was discovered at Tonopah, Nevada. The C&C became prosperous for the Southern Pacific (as well as the V&T, which had intermediate rail access),  as wagon trains would run for miles through the desert to reach the narrow-gauge line, or later on the Tonopah and Goldfield Railroad which would then carry it back to the V&T at the Mound House junction. Because the break of gauge between the Carson & Colorado and Virginia & Truckee, the Tonopah ore had to be unloaded by hand from the narrow-gauge cars and into the standard gauge cars at the C&C northern terminus, causing a backlog of traffic, as cars waited to be transferred. The problem caused by this was also apparent in delivering mining equipment and materials to the mines and the town of Tonopah which was in a building boom. Southern Pacific officials did not like this arrangement, so in 1904 they converted the narrow gauge C&C to standard gauge from Moundhouse to Mina, now renamed the Nevada & California Railroad. This allowed Southern Pacific trains to run along the V&T through to Mound House to the Nevada & California, and on down to Tonopah. In addition, the Southern Pacific (controlled at the time by the Union Pacific Railroad) offered to buy the Virginia & Truckee, but the V&T officials set their price too high (according to U.P. president Harriman). Instead, the Southern Pacific built their own line from the closest available intersect with the former C&C. The line ran 28 miles from Hazen to Fort Churchill and connected their own main lines, thus bypassing the V&T entirely.

In 1904, the corporation changed its name to the Virginia and Truckee Railway. In response to agricultural and cattle ranch concerns, the V&T built a short branch line to Minden, about 26 miles south of Carson City, in 1906. This branch line brought in increased freight traffic; as a result the V&T purchased three new ten-wheelers from Baldwin: (the first) No. 25, 26, and 27, in 1905, 1907, and 1913 respectively.

Decline of the railroad
The Virginia and Truckee's decline began as early as 1924, the first year in which the railroad had failed to make a profit. Mining revenue had dropped off to very low levels, though revenue from the Minden line continued to flow. Passenger revenue was on a steady decline, due to the increased use of the automobile on the ever-expanding highway system in the US. US 395 ran alongside the V&T from Minden all the way up to Reno and US 50 ran from South of Carson City over to Mound House and the turnoff to Nevada State Route 17 (later NV 341), the route to Virginia City.

The sole owner of the railroad in 1933 was Ogden Livingston Mills, grandson of original co-founder Darius Ogden Mills. He personally paid the deficits in the railroad's operating costs as a nod to the past and his family's involvement in the early days of Virginia City. In 1938, a year after Mills' death, the railroad went into receivership, and its management began making plans to cease operations, with the Virginia City branch already having been dismantled during that year.  At the time of the railroad's closure, it had only three locomotives operating, the second no. 25 as well as numbers 26 and 27 (all 4-6-0's built by Baldwin in 1905, 1907, and 1913, respectively).  The no. 26 was originally scheduled to haul the last train, but after making its run on May 1, 1950, the single-stall locomotive shed it was stored in on the banks of the Truckee River in Reno caught fire.  The 26, deemed as a total loss, was scrapped, and the road instead restored no. 27 for the occasion.  On May 31, 1950, the no. 27 pulled the Virginia and Truckee's final train, rather fitting as experts considered, since the 27 was the last engine purchased new by the road.

Lucius Beebe, a noted railroad historian, settled in Virginia City with Charles Clegg, a photographer and helped to revitalize the town and interest in the railroad by writing books about the Virginia & Truckee as well as other narrow gauge railroads, such as the Carson and Colorado Railroad, Denver and Rio Grande Railroad, and Rio Grande Southern Railroad.

Restoring the line

In 1972, a Virginia City railroad enthusiast , Robert C. Gray, who as a young man was one of the passengers on the last train to Virginia City in 1938, sought to rebuild the V&T as a tourist line. After gaining approval from Storey County, reconstruction of the line began from F Street to the Eastern portal of Tunnel #4. Work to re-open Tunnel #4 continued until it was finally reopened in the late 1980s. Work had started on Tunnel #3 (which had a history of instability to the point that regular passenger cars could no longer fit by the time the last trains ran in 1938), but a large boulder shifted and buried the tunnel. A shoehorn was built around the tunnel, just enough as to not be too sharp for the locomotives, opening up a view of the valley. 

Officials with the Commission held a "silver spike" ceremony January 3, 2006, in Carson City to commemorate the completion of two miles of track near Gold Hill. The construction, completed in September 2005, is part of an effort to restore the V&T's mainline from Virginia City to Carson City for operations. Then Senate Minority Leader Harry Reid (D-Nev), who was instrumental in securing $10 million in federal funding for the project, and Nevada Lieutenant Governor Lorraine Hunt, who secured an additional $1 million in state funding for the project, both spoke at the ceremony. The completion of the first phase of the extension saw the last train of the day venturing beyond Gold Hill and to American Flats, over a massive fill of the Overman Pit, near the Crown Point Ravine. This practice has been abandoned in recent years, though.

It is estimated that completion of the line from Gold Hill to downtown Carson City will cost in excess of $55 million, and it is hoped that the line, which was originally abandoned in 1938, was planned be completed and operational once again in 2012. However, as of 2022, trains only go as far as Eastgate Station, in eastern Carson City.

In June 2008, #29 returned to operation after a significant overhaul.

The public Nevada Commission for the Reconstruction of the V&T Railway has rebuilt the line from Gold Hill (connection with the current V&T Railroad) to Carson City, running the first train over the line in 68 years on August 14, 2009. The ceremonial first run from Virginia City to Mound House (referred to as "Carson City Eastgate" in official material) occurred for VIPs. On the 15th and 16th the line opened to the public

Historic equipment
 
The Virginia and Truckee's locomotives and other equipment appeared in numerous Westerns over the years since the railroad operated otherwise obsolete equipment well into the "cinema age." Many of these pieces have been restored, and are currently on display at museums throughout the country. Cars and locomotives from the original railroad are on display at the Nevada State Railroad Museum in Carson City, at the Comstock History Center on C Street in Virginia City, at the California State Railroad Museum in Sacramento and at the Railroad Museum of Pennsylvania in Strasburg.
In addition, an operating 5/8-scale replica of the V&T locomotive, Reno, has been running on the Washington Park and Zoo Railway since 1959. 
On April 18, 2018, The Nevada State Railroad Museum swapped No. 18 "Dayton" for No. 27. 27 will now be in the Comstock Historic Center, and The Dayton will reside in Carson City. On March 2, 2020, The replica of V&T #1 was shipped to Carson City, where it will reside at the Nevada State Railroad Museum and will be completed.

Other Historic designations
 National Register of Historic Places #NPS–77001508 — Virginia and Truckee Railroad Shops
 National Register of Historic Places #98001208 Virginia and Truckee Railroad Depot - Carson City
 National Historic Landmark #NPS–05000968 — Virginia and Truckee Railway Motor Car 22

Operations
In May 2013, the railroad acquired a GE 44-ton switcher engine and three passenger cars from the defunct Yuma Valley Railway. The diesel has been given the number D-3, and remained stored at the Virginia City Yard pending work until preliminary testing finally began in April 2016.

In November 2016, the railroad acquired an EMD SW1200 from Evraz, numbered 3540.

2020 saw the acquisition of a second bay-window caboose, No. 52, from Jim Dobbas Inc. in Antelope, California. The caboose, a former Union Pacific CA-11 steel caboose built in 1979 as No. 25852, began being used on daily trains to Gold Hill in August 2021, and is used to increase capacity on busy weekends.

In 2021, No. 29, along with cars 101-103, were trucked out to Pawhuska, Oklahoma to appear in the Martin Scorsese film, Killers of the Flower Moon. For the film, the Pullmans were repainted in Pullman green, while No. 29 was repainted as Atchison, Topeka and Santa Fe Railway No. 729 (the real 729 was also a 2-8-0 Consolidation, and several of its classmates are preserved). No. 29 is the latest in a long line of V&T locomotives to appear in films, as equipment from the original V&T frequently appeared in westerns by Desilu Productions. As of June 2022, the Pullmans are still wearing their movie colors, while No. 29 was quickly given its old identity back upon its return.

In February 2022, the V&T acquired three pieces of equipment from the Fillmore and Western Railway in Ventura County, California. These were an ex-CB&Q Pullman numbered 2205 and named Rancho Camulos, an ex-SP ALCO S-6 numbered 1059, and the body of a Pacific Fruit Express reefer. 1059 was acquired as a replacement for D-2.

In May 2022, the railroad acquired a Baldwin 2-8-2 from the Oregon Coast Scenic Railroad. The locomotive, No. 100, was built for the Charles R. McCormick Lumber Company in 1926, and ran on the Heber Valley Railroad from 1976 to 1989. The locomotive is currently at the Virginia City shops undergoing restoration work. It has been reassigned the tentative number 30 from SP 1251.

Current equipment

The following is a list of the locomotives currently owned by the reborn V&T.

Steam locomotives
 No. 11: V&T No. 11 4-4-0 Baldwin built in 1872.  Reno was the first locomotive to run a train between Reno and Carson City. Was considered the Crown Jewel of the V&T and given the affectionate nickname "Brass Betsy". Remained with the V&T until 1945 when she was sold to MGM, who owned her until 1970 when she was acquired by the Old Tucson Studios. The locomotive was converted to run on compressed air from a boxcar in the 1980s, and was seriously damaged by a fire in 1996, receiving a cosmetic restoration shortly thereafter and being put on display at Old Tucson Studios. The locomotive was acquired by the revived V&T in 2021, and arrived in Virginia City on August 25, 2021; it was the first time the locomotive had been in Virginia City since 1938. Inoperable, on display at Virginia City depot, planned to be restored to operation, tender currently receiving work.
 No. 18: Ex-McCloud River Railroad No. 18. Baldwin 2-8-2 built in October 1914. Leased by the commission to the V&T Railroad. Operable.
 No. 29: Ex-Louisiana and Pacific Railway No. 252. Ex-Longview, Portland and Northern Railway No. 680. Baldwin 2-8-0 built in October 1916. Acquired by V&T in 1977. Restored 2001–08. Named "Robert C. Gray". Operable. Expected to undergo 1,472 day overhaul starting in 2024.
 No. 100: Ex-Heber Valley Railroad No. 100, née Santa Maria Valley Railroad No. 100, Pope and Talbot Lumber Company No. 100, Charles R. McCormick Lumber Company No. 100. Baldwin 2-8-2 built in 1926. Acquired May 2022 from the Oregon Coast Scenic Railroad. Inoperable, undergoing restoration at the Virginia City shops. Tentatively numbered 30.
 No. 1251: Ex-Southern Pacific No. 1251. Built at SP Sacramento Shops in November 1919. On display in Stockton, California from 1957 to 1984. Arrived in Virginia City in July 1984. Inoperable and partially dismantled.

Diesel locomotives
 No. D-1: Ex-US Army No. 1694. General Electric 80-ton switcher built in 1953. Arrived in 2003. Operable and in daily service. Formerly fitted with a Nathan K3LA, but was later replaced by a Hancock air whistle.
 No. D-2: Ex-PPL Montana No. 101. ALCO S-4 built in 1951. Arrived in May 2010. Inoperable due to the scarcity of parts for its ALCO 539T engine.
 No. D-3: Ex-Yuma Valley Railway No. 3; née USMC. GE 44-ton switcher built in 1943. Arrived in May 2013. Operable and in daily service. Repainted to V&T colors in July 2017.
 No. D-4: Ex-Evraz No. 3540, nee BNSF 3540, BN 205, NP 146. EMD SW1200 built in 1957. Acquired November 2016. Operable.
 No. 1059: Ex-Fillmore and Western Railway No. 1059; née Southern Pacific No. 1059. ALCO S-6 built in 1956. Acquired February 2022. Operable.
 No. 1605: Ex-Sacramento Southern Railroad No. 1605, née United States Air Force No. 1605. GE 80-ton switcher. Acquired sometime in 2018 from Truckee Donner Railroad Society. Inoperable, used as a source of spare parts for D-1 and D-3.

Motor cars
 No. M-1: Ex-Chicago, Burlington and Quincy Railroad No. 507, later No. 9507. Built by Edwards Rail Car Company in 1926. Arrived in December 2010. Inoperable due to small wheels; used as a woodshop.

Passenger cars
 1st No. 25: Combination Car. Ex-San Francisco and North Pacific Railroad No. 37, later Northwestern Pacific Railroad No. 37. Arrived in 1975. Used as the Virginia City Ticket Office 1976–2013. Built in 1888 by Harlan & Hollingsworth. De-numbered in 2020 after the second No. 25, a cupola caboose, entered service.
 2nd No. 25: Caboose. Origin unknown. Acquired from Roaring Camp Railroads in late 2000s-early 2010s. Initially planned to be used on Eastgate trains, the frame was found to be rotting, and thus was bad-ordered. Entered service as part of a photo freight in February 2020. Serviceable.
 No. 50: Ex-Western Pacific Railroad No. 680. Bay-window caboose. Built in 1916. Entered service in 1977. Serviceable, used on Gold Hill trains. 
No. 52: Ex-Union Pacific Railroad No. 25852. CA-11 bay-window caboose. Built in 1979. Acquired 2020 from Jim Dobbas Inc. in Antelope, California. Serviceable, used on Gold Hill trains.
No. 54: Ex-WP Box Car. Converted into a tunnel car, but capable of carrying passengers. Possibly built in 1916. Last used in passenger service in the mid-1990s; reentered passenger service on June 20, 2020 to aid in social distancing during the COVID-19 pandemic; now alternates with Caboose No. 52. Serviceable, used on Gold Hill trains.
 No. 55: Ex-WP Box Car. Converted into an open-air gondola. Built in 1916. Entered service in 1977. Serviceable, used on Gold Hill trains.
 No. 100: Ex-Bangor & Aroostook parlor car No. 100. Named "Ardelle Mae", unofficially "Reno". Built in 1907 by American Car & Foundry. Used for special events.
 No. 101: Ex-Delaware, Lackawanna and Western Railroad coach. Built by Pullman Company in 1914. Named "Gold Hill". Arrived in July 2008 and entered service in May 2009. Serviceable, used on Carson City trains.
 No. 102: Ex-DL&W coach. Built in 1914 by Pullman. Named "Silver City". Entered service in May 2009. Serviceable, used on Carson City trains.
 No. 103: Ex-DL&W coach. Built by Pullman in 1917. Named "Carson City". Entered service in September 2010. Serviceable, used on Carson City trains.
 The V&T also owns several coaches that are currently stored in the Virginia City yard in a dilapidated state. One of the coaches was the private car of Confederate General Robert E. Lee, while another was a presidential car used by the Mexican Government. Another one was a former outfit dining car for the work crews of the Tonopah and Tidewater Railroad, another famous Nevada shortline. The car was also used in several movies made by R-K-O Pictures with other famous pieces of V&T rolling stock.

Former equipment 

 No. 8: Ex-Feather River Short Line No.8, née Hobart Southern. Stored operable in Mound House, with no plans to return to service on the V&T in the near future due to it being owned by the Gold Hill Historical Society and not the V&T. Baldwin 2-6-2 built in 1907. Was steamed up on Memorial Day 2012.
 No. 51: Ex-Sacramento Northern Railway No. 1644, nee WP No. 666. Bay-window caboose rebuilt from a box car in 1964. Destroyed in a fire by a welder's torch in 2003.

In popular culture
In order to ascend the mountain to Virginia City it was necessary to build an enormous trestle. Popular Nevada mythology says Crown Point Trestle was considered to be such a feat of engineering that it is featured on the Nevada State Seal. This myth is mentioned by Lucius Beebe. Former Nevada State Archivist Guy Rocha debunks this myth on the state's Myth-a-Month page, pointing out that the state seal predates the trestle and shows a viaduct, not a trestle.

See also

 List of heritage railways
 List of heritage railroads in the United States

Bibliography
 Steamcars To The Comstock, Lucius Beebe & Charles Clegg, Howell-North, 1957
 Railroads of Nevada and Eastern California, Vol. 1 The Northern Roads, David F. Myrick, Howell-North, 1962
 Rebirth of the Virginia & Truckee R. R., Ted Wurm, May-Murdoch Publications, 1992
 The Silver Short Line: A History of the Virginia & Truckee Railroad, Ted Wurm & Harre Demoro, (1983, Trans-Anglo Books).
 Virginia & Truckee: A Story of Virginia City and Comstock Times, Lucius Beebe & Charles Clegg, Howell-North, 1949
 Virginia & Truckee, The Bonanza Road, Mallory Hope Ferrell, Hundman Publishing, 1999
  Official Guidebook of the Virginia & Truckee, Stephen E. Drew, Virginia & Truckee Railroad, 2011

References

External links

 Virginia and Truckee Railroad V&T Operations

 Northern Nevada Railway Foundation
 Friends of the Nevada State Railroad Museum
 Nevada State Railroad Museum
 Virginia & Truckee Historical Society
 Kent Kristiansson's V&T History Site History, Facts, Stories
 Road Trip America visits the V&T Railroad
 V&T Route Map
 V&T Locomotives No. 18, the Dayton, and No. 22, the Inyo
 The Studio Trains — Virginia & Truckee in Films
 Guide to the Virginia & Truckee Railroad Company Records, 1872–1950 at The Bancroft Library
 A Guide to the Virginia and Truckee Railroad Company Records, NC427. Special Collections, University Libraries, University of Nevada, Reno
 Photos of the V&T

 
Heritage railroads in Nevada
Defunct Nevada railroads
Virginia City, Nevada
1870s in Nevada
1870 establishments in Nevada
American companies established in 1870
Railway companies established in 1870
History of Storey County, Nevada
History of Washoe County, Nevada